Leonard Griffin (July 1887 – death date unknown) was an American Negro league shortstop between 1907 and 1910.

A native of Columbia, Kentucky, Griffin made his Negro leagues debut in 1907 with the Indianapolis ABCs. He played for Indianapolis again in 1909, and went on to play for the New York Black Sox in 1910.

References

External links
Baseball statistics and player information from Baseball-Reference Black Baseball Stats and Seamheads

Date of birth missing
Year of death missing
Place of death missing
Indianapolis ABCs players
Baseball shortstops
Baseball players from Kentucky
People from Columbia, Kentucky
1887 births